Brigade Boys Club is a Nepalese professional football club from Lalitpur, which plays in the town of Kathmandu. The club competes in the Nepalese first division, the Martyr's Memorial A-Division League.

Current squad

References

External links
Brigade Boys FC

Football clubs in Nepal